Palissery is a census town in Thrissur district in the Indian state of Kerala.

Demographics
 India census, Palissery had a population of 7950. Males constitute 48% of the population and females 52%. Palissery has an average literacy rate of 84%, higher than the national average of 59.5%: male literacy is 86%, and female literacy is 82%. In Palissery, 11% of the population is under 6 years of age.

Education
Famous college SCMS School of Engineering and Technology is situated near Palissery. This college is rated as among top University college by India Today.

References

Cities and towns in Thrissur district